Stomphastis conflua is a moth of the family Gracillariidae. It is known from Cyprus, the Caucasus, Israel, the Palestinian Territory, Saudi Arabia, Jordan, Egypt, Zimbabwe, Nigeria, Sudan, Mozambique and South Africa.

The larvae feed on Ricinus communis. They mine the leaves of their host plant. The mine consists of an upper-surface, initially gently curving gallery, that widens abruptly into a blotch. Pupation takes place within the mine, in a white, oval cocoon. Generally, there are a number of mines in a single leaf.

References

Stomphastis
Lepidoptera of West Africa
Moths of Africa
Lepidoptera of Mozambique
Lepidoptera of Zimbabwe